Kadwa Assembly constituency is an assembly constituency in Katihar district in the Indian state of Bihar.

Katihar's best village is Sonaili.

Overview
As per Delimitation of Parliamentary and Assembly constituencies Order, 2008, No 64. Kadwa Assembly constituency is composed of the following: Kadwa and  Dandkhora community development blocks.

Kadwa Assembly constituency is part of No 11 Katihar (Lok Sabha constituency).

Members of Legislative Assembly

Election results

1977-2010
In the 2010 state assembly elections, Bhola Ray of BJP won the Kadwa assembly seat defeating his nearest rival Himraj Singh of NCP. Contests in most years were multi cornered but only winners and runners up are being mentioned. Abdul Jalil of NCP defeated Himraj Singh representing BJP in October 2005 and Bhola Ray of BJP in February 2005. Himraj Singh, Independent, defeated Abdul Jalil representing RJD in 2000. Bhola Ray of BJP defeated Gulam Asraf of JD in 1995. Abdul Jalil, Independent, defeated Bhola Ray of BJP in 1990. Usman Ghani of Congress defeated Khaja Shahid, Independent, in 1985. Mangan Insan, Independent, defeated Usman Ghani of Congress in 1980. Khaja Shahid Hussain, Independent, defeated Mangan Insan, Independent, in 1977.

2020

References

External links
 

Assembly constituencies of Bihar
Politics of Katihar district